Varidnaviria is a realm of viruses that includes all DNA viruses that encode major capsid proteins that contain a vertical jelly roll fold. The major capsid proteins (MCP) form into pseudohexameric subunits of the viral capsid, which stores the viral deoxyribonucleic acid (DNA), and are perpendicular, or vertical, to the surface of the capsid. Apart from this, viruses in the realm also share many other characteristics, such as minor capsid proteins (mCP) with the vertical jelly roll fold, an ATPase that packages viral DNA into the capsid, and a DNA polymerase that replicates the viral genome.

Varidnaviria was established in 2019 based on the shared characteristics of the viruses in the realm. There are two groups of viruses in Varidnaviria: viruses that have a double vertical jelly roll (DJR) folds in the MCP, assigned to the kingdom Bamfordvirae, and viruses that have a single vertical jelly roll (SJR) fold in the MCP, assigned to the kingdom Helvetiavirae. The DJR-MCP lineage is thought to be descended from the SJR-MCP lineage via a gene fusion event, and the SJR-MCP shows a close relation to nucleoplasmins, pointing to a possible origin of the realm's jelly roll fold MCP. Most identified eukaryotic DNA viruses belong to Varidnaviria.

Marine viruses in the realm are highly abundant worldwide and are important in marine ecology. Many animal viruses in the realm are associated with disease, including adenoviruses, poxviruses, and the African swine fever virus. Poxviruses have been prominent in the history of medicine, especially smallpox, caused by Variola virus, which was the target of the first vaccine and which later became the first disease eradicated. The realm also notably includes giant viruses that are physically larger and contain a much larger number of genes than typical viruses.

Etymology
The name "Varidnaviria" is a portmanteau of various DNA viruses and the suffix -viria, which is the suffix used for virus realms. Double-stranded DNA (dsDNA) viruses in the realm are often called non-tailed or tailless dsDNA viruses to distinguish them from the tailed dsDNA viruses of Duplodnaviria.

Characteristics

MCP, mCP, and ATPase
Most viruses in Varidnaviria contain a capsid that is made of major capsid proteins that contain vertical single (SJR) or double jelly roll (DJR) folds. The major capsid proteins are named so because they are the primary proteins that the capsid is made of. A jelly roll fold is a type of folded structure in a protein in which eight antiparallel beta strands are organized into four antiparallel beta sheets in a layout resembling a jelly roll, also called a Swiss roll. Each beta strand is a specific sequence of amino acids, and these strands bond to their antiparallel strands via hydrogen bonds. The difference between SJR and DJR folds is that a DJR fold is simply two SJR folds in a single protein. Vertical folds are those that are perpendicular to the capsid surface, in contrast to horizontal folds that are parallel to the capsid surface.

During the process of assembling the viral capsid, MCPs self-assemble into hexagonal structures, called hexons, containing multiple copies of the MCP. Hexons then bond to form the relatively flat triangular sides of the icosahedral capsid. All viruses in Varidnaviria that encode a DJR-MCP that have been analyzed in high resolution also encode a minor capsid protein (mCP) that contains an SJR fold. These mCPs assemble into pentagonal structures called pentons that form the pentagonal vertices of the icosahedral capsid.

Most members of the realm also encode genome packaging ATPases of the FtsK-HerA superfamily. The ATPases in Varidnaviria are enzymes that package the viral DNA into the capsid during the process of assembling virions. FtsK is a family of proteins that contains a transmembrane protein with four membrane-spanning helices at the start of the protein's amino acid sequence and an ATPase with a P-loop fold at the end of the protein's amino acid sequence, and the HerA family is homologous to FtsK. The exact function of the ATPase for some viruses in Varidnaviria is unclear since morphological features, such as the circular, supercoiled genome of Pseudoalteromonas virus PM2, seemingly prohibit translocation by the ATPase of DNA from outside the capsid to the inside. The subset of the FtsK-HerA superfamily found in Varidnaviria is often called the A32 clade, named after the ATPase-encoding A32(R) gene of Vaccinia virus.

Other characteristics
Apart from the core morphogenetic triad of genes, the MCP, mCP, and ATPase, certain other characteristics are common or unique in various lineages within Varidnaviria, listed hereafter.
 Many members of the realm encode a type B DNA polymerase, which copies the viral DNA, and often additional components of the DNA polymerase, such as superfamily 3 helicases, or replication initiation proteins, in the case of the family Corticoviridae. An exception is the order Halopanivirales, whose members do not encode any recognizable replication enzymes.
 Many eukaryotic DJR-MCP viruses encode a capsid maturation protease that is involved in assembling the capsid.
 Some members of the realm encode integrase, an enzyme that integrates the viral genome into the genome of the host.
 Most members of the realm have capsids in the shape of an icosahedron, containing 20 triangular faces and 12 vertices.
 In various lineages, including ascoviruses and poxviruses, the ancestral icosahedral shape of the capsid has been lost and replaced with other shapes, such as ovoids and brick-like shapes.
 Poxviruses encode a scaffold protein, which guides the geometric construction of the viral capsid, that also folds into DJR pseudo-hexamers.
 Some viruses have special vertices in their icosahedral capsids for transporting the genome out of the capsid and for making virus factories.
 For certain viruses, the genome inside the capsid is surrounded by a lipid membrane.
 Nearly all recognized DJR-MCP viruses encode an ATPase of the FtsK-HerA superfamily. Adenoviruses are the exception, instead encoding their own distinct ATPase that has the same role as the FtsK-HerA ATPase.
 The family Finnlakeviridae and a provisional group called the Odin group, both proposed members of Varidnaviria, lack the signature FtsK-HerA superfamily ATPase.
 All members of Varidnaviria except for Finnlakeviridae, a proposed member family, have dsDNA genomes. Viruses in Finnlakeviridae instead have single-stranded DNA (ssDNA) genomes.

Phylogenetics
It has been suggested that Varidnaviria predates the last universal common ancestor (LUCA) of cellular life and that viruses in the realm were present in the LUCA. The vertical SJR-MCPs of Halopanivirales, assigned to the kingdom Helvetiavirae, unlike SJR folds found outside of Varidnaviria, show a relation to a group of proteins that includes the Cupin superfamily and nucleoplasmins, pointing to a possible origin of the major capsid protein of Varidnaviria among this group. The DJR-MCP lineage, assigned to the kingdom Bamfordvirae, thereafter appears to have come into existence by means of a gene fusion event that merged the two SJR-MCPs into one, indicated by the two SJR-MCPs forming a lattice in the capsid that structurally resembles the DJR-MCP capsid lattice. Archaeal dsDNA viruses in Portogloboviridae contain just one vertical SJR-MCP, which appears to have been duplicated to two for Halopanivirales, so the MCP of Portogloboviridae likely represents an earlier stage in the evolutionary history of Varidnaviria MCPs. However, another scenario was later proposed in which the Bamfordvirae and Helvetiavirae kingdoms would originate independently suggesting that the Bamfordvirae DJR-MCP protein snow a relation with the bacterial DUF 2961 protein, leading to a revision of the realm Varidnaviria. It is possible that the Bamfordvirae DJR-MCP will evolve from this protein independently, however the origin of the DJR-MCP by duplication of the Helvetiavirae SJR-MCP cannot yet be ruled out. A molecular phylogenetic analysis suggests that Helvetiavirae had no involvement in the origin of the Bamfordvirae DJR-MCP and that they probably derive from the class Tectiliviricetes.

Viruses in Bamfordvirae appear to have made crossed from prokaryotes to eukaryotes early in eukaryotic history, via infection by a tectivirus or tectivirus-like virus of a bacterium that became a bacterial symbiont in a proto-eukaryote. From there, based on phylogenetic analysis of the viral DNA polymerase and other characteristics, eukaryotic viruses in Bamfordvirae appear to have formed a complex relationship with various selfish genetic elements, including polintons, a type of transposon, portions of DNA that can self-replicate and integrate themselves into other parts of the same DNA molecule, and certain types of plasmids, which are extra-chromosomal DNA molecules that self-replicate inside of the cell or organelle that they occupy.

The initial bacterial symbiont is likely to have become mitochondria, with mitochondrial linear plasmids descended from tectiviruses remaining. Another divergent lineage reached the nucleus and recombined with transposons, becoming polintons, which may have been the first eukaryotic viruses in Bamfordvirae or related to the first ones. Polintons then gave rise to multiple lineages by various mechanisms. Among these lineages are full-fledged viruses, including adenoviruses and giant viruses, cytoplasmic linear plasmids, virophages, which are satellite viruses of giant viruses, transpovirons, which are linear plasmid-like DNA molecules found in giant viruses, and bidnaviruses via genetic recombination with a parvovirus, both of which are classified in the realm Monodnaviria.
However, this scenario was contradicted by a molecular phylogenetic analysis suggesting that tectiviruses and polintons had no involvement in the origin of eukaryotic viruses in Varidnaviria and that polintons are probably derived from these eukaryotic viruses.

While the jelly roll fold is found in other realms, including the family Microviridae in Monodnaviria and various single-stranded RNA viruses in Riboviria, the jelly roll fold found in Varidnaviria is vertical, i.e. perpendicular to the capsid surface, contrary to the jelly roll folds in other realms, which are horizontal, i.e. parallel to the capsid surface. In general, the other virus realms have no apparent relation based on common descent to Varidnaviria.

Classification
Varidnaviria has two kingdoms: Bamfordvirae and Helvetiavirae, the latter of which is monotypic down to the rank of family. This taxonomy can be visualized as follows:
 Kingdom: Bamfordvirae, which encode a major capsid protein that contains a vertical double jelly roll fold
 Kingdom: Helvetiavirae, which encode a major capsid protein that contains a vertical single jelly roll fold
 Phylum: Dividoviricota
 Class: Laserviricetes
 Order: Halopanivirales

All recognized members of Varidnaviria belong to Group I: dsDNA viruses of the Baltimore classification system, which groups viruses together based on how they produce messenger RNA. The family Finnlakeviridae, a proposed family of Varidnaviria, belongs to Group II: ssDNA viruses and would be the only ssDNA virus in the realm. Most identified DNA viruses that infect eukaryotes belong to Varidnaviria, the other major lineages of eukaryotic DNA viruses being the order Herpesvirales, which infect animals, in Duplodnaviria, and the class Papovaviricetes, which infect animals, in Monodnaviria. Realms are the highest level of taxonomy used for viruses in and Varidnaviria is one of four, the other three being Duplodnaviria, Monodnaviria, and Riboviria.

The unassigned family Portogloboviridae is a proposed family of the realm since its capsid proteins appear to be homologous to those of viruses in Varidnaviria.

Another proposed group is the Naldaviricetes class (including Polydnaviridae). These viruses encompass several genes that are distantly related to core genes of the Nucleocytoviricota and thus could be highly derived members of the DJR-MCP viruses, despite the absence of the DJR-MCP and formation of odd-shaped virions. Preliminary phylogenetic analysis of several essential genes that are shared by all these arthropod viruses and the Nucleocytoviricota, such as PolB, RNAP subunits, helicase-primase and thiol oxidoreductase, has suggested that this group of viruses might be a highly derived offshoot of the Nucleocytoviricota.

Interactions with hosts

Disease
Bacteriophages in Varidnaviria are potentially a major cause of death among marine prokaryotes. This viewpoint is based on autolykiviruses having broad host ranges, infecting and killing many different strains of various bacteria species, in contrast to tailed bacteriophages, which have more limited host ranges, as well as on the apparently large number of marine non-tailed dsDNA viruses. Algal viruses of the family Phycodnaviridae play an important role in controlling algal blooms as well as, with many marine viruses in general, contributing to a process called viral shunt, whereby organic material from killed organisms are "shunted" by viruses away from higher trophic levels and recycled for consumption by those at lower trophic levels.

The most notable disease-causing viruses in Varidnaviria are adenoviruses, poxviruses, and the African swine fever virus (ASFV). Adenoviruses typically cause mild respiratory, gastrointestinal, and conjunctival illnesses, but occasionally cause more severe illnesses, such as hemorrhagic cystitis, hepatitis, and meningoencephalitis. Poxviruses infect many animals and typically cause non-specific symptoms paired with a characteristic rash that is called a pox. Notable poxviruses include Variola virus, which causes smallpox, and Vaccinia virus, which is used as the vaccine against smallpox. ASFV is usually asymptomatic in its natural reservoirs but causes a lethal hemorrhagic fever in domestic pigs that is a concern for agricultural production.

Endogenization
Many viruses in Varidnaviria encode the enzyme integrase, allowing them to integrate their genome into their host and behave like transposons. The closely related polintons are apparently always endogenized in their hosts. This integration of viral DNA into the host's genome is a form of horizontal gene transfer between unrelated organisms, although polintons are typically transmitted vertically from parent to child.

Adapative immunity
A peculiar example of endogenization in Varidnaviria are virophages, satellite viruses that are dependent on giant virus infection to replicate. Virophages replicate by hijacking the replication apparati of giant viruses, thereby suppressing the number of giant virus virions produced, increasing the likelihood of host survival. Some virophages are able to become endogenized, and this endogenization can be considered a form of adaptive immunity for the host against giant virus infection.

History
Diseases caused by poxviruses have been known for much of recorded history. Smallpox in particular has been highly prominent in modern medicine; the first vaccine to be invented targeted smallpox, and smallpox would later become the first disease to be eradicated. Human adenoviruses were the first DJR-MCP viruses in Varidnaviria to have their MCPs analyzed, standing out for having jelly roll folds that were perpendicular, rather than parallel, to the capsid surface. In 1999, the structure of the MCP of Pseudomonas virus PRD1 was resolved, showing that the DJR-MCP lineage included prokaryotic viruses. Haloarcula hispanica virus SH1 would later, in 2003, become the first SJR-MCP virus discovered.

Over time, the use of metagenomics has allowed for the identification of viruses in the environment even without identification of the host or laboratory specimens, leading to the discovery of many additional members of the realm. Morphological surveys of marine samples suggest that non-tailed dsDNA viruses may be more numerous than the tailed dsDNA viruses of Duplodnaviria, which, as of 2019, are the largest and most diverse lineage of viruses documented. With the increased knowledge of the viruses of the realm, Varidnaviria was established in 2019 based on the shared traits of viruses in the realm.

The establishment of Varidnaviria has allowed for newly discovered and related, yet divergent, viruses to be classified in higher taxa. This includes proposed families such as Finnlakeviridae, which would be the only family in the realm with a single-stranded DNA genome, Autolykiviridae, which have a broad host range and which may play a major role in the deaths of marine bacteria, and the "Odin" group, which encode a protein that has no known relation to any other proteins in place of the FtsK-HerA superfamily ATPase. In 2020, autolykiviruses were officially classified for the first time.

See also

 List of higher virus taxa

Notes

References

Further reading
 

Virus realms